Electric and Acoustic Hard Cell Live is a live album by saxophonist Tim Berne's Hard Cell which was recorded in 2005 and released on Berne's Screwgun label.

Reception
The AllMusic review awarded the album 4 stars stating "This band is incredible. Berne and company are at the vanguard of new jazz for the 21st century, and the rapid pace at which their catalog is expanding is really separating them from the pack. Brilliant". Pitchfork's Chris Dahlen said "With its raw sound and straightforward title, Electric and Acoustic Hard Cell Live feels like a bootleg. If you ignore Steve Byram's fantastic cover art, it's easy to imagine this as a cassette labeled in handwritten scrawl: "these are the good parts."

Track listing
All compositions by Tim Berne
 "Van Gundy's Retreat" - 7:30   
 "Huevos" - 10:09   
 "Traction" - 11:28   
 "Manatee Woman" - 16:02

Personnel
Tim Berne - alto saxophone, baritone saxophone
Craig Taborn - piano, keyboards, electronics
Tom Rainey - drums

References 

2004 live albums
Tim Berne live albums
Screwgun Records live albums